Buller County may refer to:
 Buller County, New South Wales, Australia
 Buller County, New Zealand